Hylaeochelys is an extinct genus of plesiochelyid turtle that lived during the Late Jurassic-Early Cretaceous in Portugal, Spain, France, and southern England. The type species was originally named by Richard Owen as Pleurosternon latiscutatum in 1853, before being moved to the new genus Hylaeochelys by Richard Lydekker in 1889. Other species included in the genus are H. belli, H. kappa and H. lata, originally named under different genera by Gideon Mantell and Owen, respectively. All species are represented by carapaces, primarily from the Lulworth Formation of the Purbeck Limestone Group that was deposited during the Berriasian.

References

Plesiochelyidae
Late Jurassic turtles
Early Cretaceous turtles
Prehistoric turtle genera
Fossil taxa described in 1889